La Mentira (Lit. title: The Lie / International title: Twisted Lies) is a Mexican telenovela produced by Carlos Sotomayor for Televisa. The telenovela aired on Canal de las Estrellas from July 13, 1998 to November 27, 1998. It is an adaptation of the 1965 telenovela of the same name.

It stars Kate del Castillo, Guy Ecker, Karla Álvarez, Salvador Pineda, Rosa María Bianchi, Sergio Basáñez, Eric del Castillo, and Blanca Guerra.

Plot
Demetrio Azunsolo arrives in a small remote village outside Mexico where his beloved half-brother, Ricardo Platas, used to live and run a tequila plantation, only to find out that the latter has just committed suicide, after being betrayed by a selfish, greedy woman.

Little by little, and thanks to the village inhabitants - who at first are hostile towards him but then become his friends - Demetrio puts together the pieces of the puzzle that led to the tragedy.

The clues bring him to Mexico City, in the villa of a wealthy family, the Fernandez-Negrete's who are the owners of the FERNE Bank, one of the most important banks in Mexico, where Ricardo had spent some time in the past as a trusted worker.

According to the info he has in hand, in that house lives the woman who is the cause of Ricardo's suicide. Demetrio meets two young women there, both nieces of the family: the innocent and fragile Virginia Fernandez-Negrete and the dynamic and self-confident Verónica Fernandez-Negrete.

Not sure who of them is the guilty one, Demetrio gets trapped in a series of co-incidences and sly gossip and ends up believing in the end that the woman he is looking for is Verónica.

Once ascertained, he puts to practice his plan for revenge. He flirts with Verónica, seduces her and makes her fall in love with him so as to marry him. After the wedding, he practically abducts her and brings her to the small remote village where Ricardo ended his life, decides to make her life a misery and take revenge for his brother's death.

Little does he know that he, as well as Verónica, are in fact victims of someone whose angel face hides a demonic soul and who actually was the one responsible for Ricardo's suicide.

When he finds out, it seems that all is lost as Verónica abandons him because he doesn't trust her and instead has been taken in by gossip and deception; so he must struggle to regain her love. In the end, love wins, but not without cost.

Cast

Main 
 Kate del Castillo as Verónica Fernandez-Negrete de Azunsolo 
 Guy Ecker as Demetrio Azunsolo
 Karla Álvarez as Virginia Fernandez-Negrete
 Salvador Pineda as Dr. Francisco Moguel
 Rosa María Bianchi as Sara Montero de Fernandez-Negrete
 Sergio Basáñez as Juan Fernandez-Negrete Montero
 Eric del Castillo as Teodoro Fernandez-Negrete
 Blanca Guerra as Miranda Montesinos
 Aarón Hernán as Father Pablo Williams
 Carlos Cámara as Don José "Pepe" Diez
 Silvia Mariscal as Leticia "Lety" Montero
 Guillermo Rivas as Professor Aguirre
 Tony Bravo as André Belot
 Tina Romero as Irma de Moguel
 Luis Gatica as Santiago Terrazas
 Israel Jaitovich as Jacinto Ávila
 Roxana Castellanos as Yadira Balanzario
 Amparo Garrido as Antonia "Toña" 
 Julio Bracho as Carlitos Jr.

Recurring 
 Mayrin Villanueva as Nicole Belot
 José Antonio Ferral as Natalicio Gómez "Don Nato"
 Claudia Eliza Aguilar as Gildarda
 Vanessa Arias as Beatriz "Betty"
 Gabriela Arroyo as Maruquita
 Antonio de la Vega as Pepe Martínez
 Vicente Herrera as Mauricio Pérez
 Gustavo Negrete as Carlos
 Rodrigo Abed as Ricardo Platas
 Alex Trillanes as Marcos
 Claudia Troyo as Irazema
 Audrey Vera as Karla
 Sergio Reynoso as Licenciado Ernesto Saucedo
 Liza Willert as Señora Gilbert
 Carmela Masso as Chona
 Eugenia Avendaño as Guadalupe de Martínez
 Alexandra Monterrubio as Julia
 Miguel Ángel Biaggio as Waiter

Awards and nominations

References

External links

1998 telenovelas
Mexican telenovelas
1998 Mexican television series debuts
1998 Mexican television series endings
Spanish-language telenovelas
Television shows set in Mexico
Televisa telenovelas